Gautam Bhatia is an Indian architect. He grew up in New Delhi and completed his master's degree in architecture at the University of Pennsylvania. Gautam Bhatia is also a writer and an artist. He has published many books on architecture and satire and his drawing and scriptures have been displayed in galleries in India and different countries.

Education 
Gautam Bhatia completed his Bachelor degree in Fine arts in year 1974 from George Washington University, Washington DC, USA. He is a Master of Architecture from University of Pennsylvania, Philadelphia, Pa. USA.

Books 

 Laurie Baker: Life, Work, and Writings, Viking, 1991,
 Punjabi Baroque, Penguin, 1994,
 Silent Spaces, Penguin, 1995,
 Malaria Dreams, Penguin, 1996,
 Punchtantra, Penguin, 1998
 A Short History of Everything, Harper Collins, 1998,
 Eternal Stone, Edited, Penguin, 1999,
 A Moment in Architecture, Tulika, 2002,
 Comic Century, Penguin, 2004,
 Whitewash, Viveka Foundation, 2007,
 Lie, A Graphic Novel, Westland Press, 2010.

Awards and honors 
 2011 First Prize, National Competition, Secretariat Building, Arunachal Pradesh,

 2007 Archi-Design Award for Recreational Architecture,

 2003 A+D National Award for Institutional Building,

 2003 A+D National Award for Housing,

 2003 A+D National Award for Hotels,

 Commendation Award 2002 Competition for the Mahatma Gandhi International University, Wardha,
 2002 JK Architect of the Year Award for Monolith Resorts,

 2001 Habitat Award, Visual Arts Gallery, Habitat Centre,

 1999 Inside Outside Designer of the Year Award for Devigarh Palace Hotel, Udaipur,

 1998 JK Architect of the Year Award for the Children's Retreat,
 1994 First Prize Architectural Competition for the CRY-Oxfam Headquarters,

 1987 First Prize Architectural Competition for Memorial to Mahatma Gandhi,

 1986 Second Prize Architectural Competition for the Indira Gandhi Centre for Arts,
 Received Ford Foundation grant for Desh Ki Awaaz, a collaborative arts project, 2004,

 Received grant from the Charles Wallace Trust for research on Colonial Architecture at the India Office Library, London,1997,

 Received grants from the Graham and Fulbright Foundations for research on mud architecture at the Aga Khan Program at Harvard University and MIT, 1992,

 Received Ford Foundation Grant for a Documentation of Mud Architecture,1986,

 Awarded 1977 Louis Kahn Fellowship in Architecture, Univ. of Pennsylvania,
 Awarded 1976 Dales Memorial Fellowship for Architectural Study in Europe,

 Awarded First Place Lisner Gallery Art Exhibition, Washington, D.C.

References

External links
 Gautam Bhatia columns at Indian Express.
 Gautam Bhatia columns at Outlook
 Gautam Bhatia columns at Mint
Gautam Bhatia texts and drawings at Architexturez 

1952 births
Living people
Writers from Delhi
20th-century Indian architects
Indian satirists
Indian architecture writers
University of Pennsylvania School of Design alumni